American Inventory was a thirty-minute weekly filmed educational series that first aired as a summer replacement Sunday nights during 1951 on NBC. It was funded by the Alfred P. Sloan Foundation with NBC donating the broadcast time and facilities. The series incorporated panel discussions, lectures from experts, film of activities and events taking place out of the studio, and occasional in-studio dramatic scenes. It was an ambitious project, the first educational series produced and broadcast by a network.

Premise
Described as "adult education", the goal was to provide information to Americans about their own history and resources and issues facing them as a society. The first summer series would focus on social and economic questions. Later seasons would explore natural sciences and humanities.  Many of the first episodes focused on contrasting life in authoritarian states, principally the Soviet Union, with the United States. Many episodes had a one-time host or narrator; there was no continuing position. Opening titles and closing credits were subdued, amounting to little more than one title card for the former and four or five for the latter; there was no "credit crawl". Guests were introduced orally on camera at beginning and end; only the principal crew were in the end credits.

Beginning in the summer of 1952 a new type of episode was featured, in which various professions were examined in a dramatised setting, under the collective title of "American Gallery". The following year NBC announced the show would now provide "Education and Entertainment", with an emphasis on dramas and musical performances. The musical emphasis trailed off in the spring of 1954; by the last season (1955) the series schedule was heavy with business-friendly anthology stories.

Production
NBC was responsible for the content and supplied the production crew for creating the episodes. The NBC studio in Spanish Harlem was used, but episodes were also produced in other cities, such as Chicago where a mass Civil Defense exercise was recorded. The show's creator and producer was  William "Bill" Hodapp from Louisville, Kentucky. He was executive producer at Teleprograms, Inc, which produced the show for NBC. According to one newspaper article, about 500 people were involved in staging each episode of the series. Visual effects more associated with movies than early television were created in the NBC studio. The production team was not concerned with smooth-flowing dialogue or actions, leading some to believe the show was aired live. There was often no film editor credited, and the show exhibited a feeling of having been shot once with minimal rehearsal.

The show began with an order for thirteen episodes, rather than the full 39 associated with season-driven series. Near the end of airing that first order the Sloan Foundation asked for more episodes. By late February 1952 the Sloan Foundation committed $140,000 for a second set of 39 episodes. The network broadcast took long breaks during the summer of 1952 while producer Bill Hodapp travelled to Europe with three camera crews for research and footage for upcoming shows. By the time the 75th episode aired during February 1953, the Sloan Foundation announced it had ordered another 39 episodes.

According to columnist John Crosby, one episode was filmed and broadcast in color on March 28, 1954. New production of the show ceased in April 1954 for up to five months when Hodapp left as producer, leaving NBC still owing the Sloan Foundation thirty-two episodes for the fourth season. After the fourth season finished up in March 1955, production again ceased until the short fifth season resumed in late summer of that year.

Response
Critical response to the first episode ranged from discouraging to equivalence. Larry Wolters from the Chicago Tribune felt it was too analytical and dry, lacked inspiration and a proper ending. Ben Gross from the Daily News judged "although this promises to be a most interesting and worthwhile series, the opening episode was in no way superior to the average documentary". The Boston Globe reviewer also thought the first episode was "too abstract". However, the fourth episode, a panel discussion among health and emergency workers, filmed amid a massive Civil Defense exercise simulating a nuclear strike in the Chicago area, provoked a re-evaluation from the Boston Globe: "...the show was an excellent documentary, very well produced and guided by Clifton Utley".

Critical appreciation grew as the series went on. The show won an award from the Institute of Education, an annual conference at Ohio State University, during June 1952. Reviewer Bill Coleman at The Tablet called it a "worthwhile program which didn't get all the publicity it should have" in its debut season. The New York Times said American Inventory should be praised for its courage in devising new formats for presenting educational material almost every week, while acknowledging it sometimes didn't work.

Broadcast history
Broadcast of the show began Sunday, July 1, 1951, at 7 pm Eastern time. Coverage was at first limited to the NBC network east of the Mississippi river. Some stations in Texas had a two week delay in their viewing the premiere while AT&T technicians hooked broadcasting towers up to the private network lines. Gradually coverage expanded to the rest of the country, with subscribing stations not yet connected to the network receiving film reels. By October 1951 there were 63 stations receiving the series. Because it was a filmed series, not live, stations had the option to run it at different times, rather than accept the network feed. During the summer of 1951, NBC switched the network broadcast to 1:30 pm Eastern time. At the end of March 1952 there was a two week hiatus during which repeats of earlier programs were broadcast. There was a monthlong hiatus for the network broadcast during June 1952, followed by two new episodes then another monthlong break until early August. Meanwhile, the network kept moving the broadcast time every few months, from afternoons to evenings and back again.

A six-month hiatus of new broadcasts occurred from April through mid-September 1954 after creator-producer Bill Hodapp left the show. Another break occurred in April 1955 when NBC removed American Inventory from its Sunday schedule. It was brought back for a single broadcast on May 22, 1955, but remained off the air until September 18, 1955.

The final show of the series was first broadcast December 25, 1955. However, many stations hadn't yet run thru their inventory of episodes. There was a sharp fall-off of stations carrying the show in January 1956, followed by a long decrease thru May 1956. The last station that ran the show was KFAR-TV in Fairbanks, Alaska, where it aired thru December 1956.

Episodes
The tables below are separated into "seasons" by either production orders from the Sloan Foundation (where known) or long breaks in the broadcasting schedule. Its unknown if there was any acknowledgement of seasonal debuts or distinctions on the show. Original air date is for the network feed; some stations were two weeks or more behind in their broadcasts. "Guests" is used in place of "Cast" except where the episode was known to be dramatised.

Season 1 (1951-52)

Season 2 (1952-53)

Season 3 (1953-54)

Season 4 (1954-55)

Season 5 (1955)

Notes

References

American educational television series
1951 American television series debuts
1955 American television series endings
NBC original programming